Kingfishers Catch Fire is a 1953 comedy novel by the British writer Rumer Godden. It was party inspired by her own time living in Kashmir. The title is taken from the poem by Gerard Manley Hopkins.

Synopsis
After she is widowed and left with little money and two children, an independent-minded Englishwoman chooses to live in India rather than return to Britain. She is idealistically attracted to living a peasant lifestyle in a small village. A series of cultural misunderstandings follow with the local inhabitants.

References

Bibliography
 Lassner, Phyllis. Colonial Strangers: Women Writing the End of the British Empire. Rutgers University Press, 2004.
 Le-Guilcher, Lucy. Rumer Godden: International and Intermodern Storyteller. Routledge, 2016.

1953 British novels
Novels by Rumer Godden
Novels set in British India
British comedy novels
Macmillan Publishers books